Monster Mansion is a theme park ride.

Monster Mansion may also refer to:

HM Prison Wakefield
HM Prison Frankland

See also
 Munster Mansion